The Springfield Babes was an American soccer club based in Springfield, Massachusetts that was a member of the American Soccer League. The club folded during its only season in the ASL, stopping play in December 1926 with 17 games still to play.

Year-by-year

References

Defunct soccer clubs in Massachusetts
American Soccer League (1921–1933) teams
Sports teams in Springfield, Massachusetts
1926 establishments in Massachusetts
1926 disestablishments in Massachusetts
Association football clubs established in 1926
Association football clubs disestablished in 1926